Abdel Nasser Ould Ethmane is one of the founding members of SOS Slaves. He along with Boubacar Messaoud founded the human rights organization to abolish slavery in Mauritania.

Life
As a 7 year old Abdel, was given the choice between gifts, and he choose to assume ownership of Yebawa Ould Keihel, a young dark skinned boy. Despite their bond, formed from childhood and nursing together, the two boys had been thrust into a master-slave relationship, and were prevented from fraternizing.

While studying in Nouakchott, Abdel received a thorough education while living a nomadic life style. One notable aspect of Abdel's education, was his quirky European tutor who assigned Abdel to the French Cultural Center, to supplement his education. While studying there, he became enamored by something he read in a text about the French revolution:

This saying would soon take on greater significance to Nasser over the next few years, as it began an awakening that would forever alter his values. After a period of reflection, he consulted with his father for advice. Abdel discovered that his father not only encouraged his dissent from this custom, but in the past had tried to free his slaves, only to be met with resistance from the slaves themselves.

Abdel, now able to contextualize the circumstances which allow for slavery to be perpetuated in his country, began to denounce slavery. He trained himself to do the basics, everyday tasks which were once performed by his slaves.

International Work
Abdel is a UN advisor to the office of West Africa. He is also a member of the Human Rights Foundation's International Council.

SOS Slaves
In 1995, Abdel founded SOS Slaves with Boubacar Messaoud, a former slave. Together they sought to end the practice of slavery in Mauritania, which had already been illegal since 1981.
 
Both men have been arrested and beaten in their attempt to convince both the slave owning class, and blacks, of the wrongness of slavery.

SOS Slaves published the stories of slaves who had been freed, in addition to lobbying on the behalf of slaves who had not yet been freed. In 2007 the Mauritanian government voted unanimously to make slave ownership a crime.

References

External links
 The Human Rights Foundation
 Oslo Freedom Forum

Abolitionists
Anti-racism activists
Mauritanian human rights activists
Mauritanian activists
Living people
Year of birth missing (living people)